Sharifabad (also Romanized as Sharīfābād) is a village in Sharifabad Rural District, Mohammadiyeh District, Alborz County, Qazvin Province, Iran. At the 2006 census, its population was 16,551, in 4,248 families.

References 

Populated places in Alborz County